Panthir ("Panther") was an  which served in the Hellenic Royal Navy from 1912 to 1946.

Origin 

Panthir was originally named Santiago del Estero. They were purchased in 1912 by Greece, ready for delivery, each for the sum of £148,000, when the Balkan Wars seemed likely. Accepted by Captain Ath. Miaoulis, RHN in Palermo, Sicily, where she arrived manned by a foreign crew.

Service history 

During the Balkan Wars, the Royal Hellenic Navy purchased only the minimum amount of ammunition, 3,000 rounds of torpedoes. Torpedoes were not available for this class of ship, and for this reason these ships were initially named 'scouts' rather than 'destroyers'.

During World War I, Greece belatedly entered the war on the side of the Triple Entente and, due to Greece's neutrality the four Aetos-class ships were seized by the Allies in October 1916, taken over by the French in November, and served in the French Navy from 1917 to 1918. By 1918, they were back on escort duty under Greek colors, mainly in the Aegean Sea.

During the Greco-Turkish war, she took part in the blockade of the Anatolian coasts.

After the war, Panthir was refurbished from 1925 to 1927.  She also participated in the Second World War, after surviving the German invasion of April, 1941, Panthir was based in the Indian Ocean. Between May and October, 1942, her armament was updated in Bombay enabling her to offer better anti-aircraft protection and anti-surface capabilities on her new missions.

After the end of World War II, Panthir was stricken in 1946.

See also
 History of the Hellenic Navy

References

Aetos-class destroyers
World War II destroyers of Greece
1911 ships
Military units and formations of Greece in the Balkan Wars
Ships built on the River Mersey